Solar Learning is a Philippine educational UHF television channel which broadcasts as a relay feed of the DepEd TV programming service. It is owned by Solar Entertainment Corporation in partnership with the Department of Education (DepEd).

The channel is currently available via DTT broadcast frequencies in Metro Manila: Channel 21 (airing the ALS feed daily from 8 am to 11 pm) and Channel 30 (airing the Central feed from Mondays to Saturdays from 7 am to 7 pm).

History
The channel began its test broadcast in around June 2020. It began simulcasting the dry run broadcast of DepEd TV programming from August 11, 2020, until its suspension the following week, and another dry run broadcast from September 21 to 25, 2020.

References

Solar Learning
Television networks in the Philippines
Television channels and stations established in 2020
2020 establishments in the Philippines
Solar Entertainment Corporation channels